Sergey Nikolaevich Arkhipov (born 23 June 1954) is a Russian chess player.

Arkhipov earned the FIDE title of Grandmaster (GM) in 1991. His peak rating was 2560.

Personal life 
Arkhipov is married to Natalia Alekhina, who is also a professional chess player with a Woman Grandmaster (WGM) title.

References

External links 
 
 

1954 births
Living people
Russian chess players
Chess grandmasters